Bobbikins is a 1959 British comedy film directed by Robert Day and starring Shirley Jones and Max Bygraves. It was made in CinemaScope and released by 20th Century Fox. It was produced by the British subsidiary of 20th Century Fox and shot at Elstree Studios.

Plot
This adventure follows the story of a young navy man, his wife (Shirley Jones) and their baby son, Bobby aka Bobbikins. To his surprise, Dad discovers his son talks, not baby-talk or gibberish but has adult conversations with his father only. Bobbikins learns stock market tips and passes them to his Dad.

After making a killing on the stock market, problems really begin. The dad is presumed mad, the government is after him, and the break down of relations between the young couple ensues. But there is hope.

Cast
 Shirley Jones as Betty Barnaby
 Max Bygraves as Ben Barnaby
 Steven Stocker as Bobbikins Barnaby
 Billie Whitelaw as Lydia Simmons
 Barbara Shelley as Valerie
 Colin Gordon as Dr. Phillips
 Charles 'Bud' Tingwell as Luke Parker
 Lionel Jeffries as Gregory Mason
 Charles Carson as Sir Jason Crandall
 Rupert Davies as Jock Fleming
 Noel Hood as Nurse
 David Lodge as Hargreave
 John Welsh as Admiral
 Bill Nagy as Rogers - The Butler

References

External links
 
 
 
 

1959 films
British comedy films
1959 comedy films
Films directed by Robert Day
20th Century Fox films
Films about babies
Films shot at British National Studios
1950s English-language films
1950s British films